The 1934 World Table Tennis Championships women's doubles was the seventh edition of the women's doubles championship. The Championships were held in December 1933 but are officially listed as the 1934 Championships.
Mária Mednyánszky and Anna Sipos defeated Anita Felguth-Denker and Astrid Krebsbach in the final by three sets to one to secure a fifth consecutive title.

Results

See also
List of World Table Tennis Championships medalists

References

-
-